The Mines Rescue Rules, 1985  came into force with effect from 2 April 1985 in India, replacing the previous Coal Mines Rescue Rules-1959, to provide for rescue of work persons in the event of explosion, fire etc. in the Mines.  

These rules apply to coal and metalliferous underground mines to provide for the establishment of rescue stations and conduct of rescue work.  In case of  explosion or fire, an inrush of water or influx of gases, services of specially trained men with special rescue apparatuses are required.

Salient Features 
Chapter I - Preliminary

Chapter II - Rescue Stations and Rescue Rooms

Chapter III - Duties and Responsibilities of Superintendents etc.

Chapter IV - Organisation and Equipment in Mines

Chapter V - Conduct of Rescue Work

Chapter VI – Miscellaneous

References

See also
 Coal Mines Regulation Act 1908
 Quecreek Mine rescue
 Mine-rescue-training(MSHA)   

Coal mining law
Mine safety
Occupational safety and health organizations
Safety engineering
Indian legislation
Mining in India